Robert J. Healey Jr. (May 3, 1957 – March 20, 2016) was an American attorney, businessman, and political activist. He was the founder of Rhode Island's Cool Moose Party, the state's third-largest political party from 1994 until 2002, and was a perennial candidate for statewide office. Healey ran for governor or lieutenant governor a total of seven times. Running as an independent candidate in 2010, he won 39% of the vote for lieutenant governor, running on a platform of abolishing the office. As the Moderate Party nominee for governor in 2014, Healey won 22% of the vote while spending less than $40 on the campaign.

Early life, education and early career
Robert J. Healey was born in Providence, Rhode Island to Robert J. Healey Sr. and Mary (née Martinelli) Healey on May 3, 1957. His father was a plumber and his mother a factory worker. He grew up in Warren, Rhode Island, and graduated from Warren High School in 1975. He went on to earn a bachelor's degree in English and Secondary Education from Rhode Island College, a master's degree in Reading Education from Boston University (1980), a degree in law from the New England School of Law (1983), and a master's degree in English literature from Northeastern University (1985). In 1983 he began a PhD program at Columbia University, but after he had completed all the requirements, his dissertation supervisor died and he could not find a replacement.

He was elected to the Warren School Committee in 1982, serving as chairman until 1986. His election slogan was "A Strange Man for a Strange Job". He ran for governor as an independent in 1986. After his first run for governor, He was also secretary of the Bristol County Bar association.

Cool Moose Party
The Cool Moose Party (CMP) was founded by Healey in 1994 during his second gubernatorial campaign. The party's platform is "to break down the ideological barriers that have kept common sense out of our government". Healey won 9% of the vote in 1994. In 1996, twenty CMP candidates ran for office; all were defeated.

In 1998, the Cool Moose Party successfully sued the state of Rhode Island to change its restrictive laws regarding primary elections. Cool Moose Party v. State of Rhode Island has been referenced in other states' court decisions relating to third-party candidates.

Healey ran for lieutenant governor in 2002, 2006, and 2010. In 2010 he ran on a platform of abolishing the office, as it has no constitutionally-mandated duties outside of waiting for the governor to become incapacitated. Running against incumbent Lieutenant Governor Elizabeth Roberts in that election, Healey won 39% of the vote after Republican Heidi Rogers dropped out so as not to split the "abolish the office" vote.

2014 gubernatorial campaign
In September 2014, Healey announced he was running for governor as a Moderate Party candidate. His announcement came after the original Moderate nominee, James Spooner, withdrew from the race for health reasons. Healey stated he would not accept any funding, instead opting for a "guerilla campaign" for a "cerebral revolution". Shortly after he filed his candidacy, the Rhode Island GOP challenged the legality of the move on procedural grounds. The state board of elections found that Healey was in fact eligible to replace Spooner on the ballot. Healey spent a total of only $35.31 on his entire gubernatorial campaign, which he said went to purchase a prepaid mobile phone and a phone card, items he purchased himself. Healey's only advertisement during the campaign was a minimalist billboard featuring a caricature of his face, which he painted himself on the side of his friend's house overlooking Interstate 95 in Providence.

Healey came in third, with 21.4% of the election votes.

Other activities
Healey invested in several business ventures. A liquor wholesaling company that he founded with a partner was very successful and Healey sold out his stake and invested in land in South America. He also exported California wines to Uruguay, imported tableware from Uruguay, started an ice cream business, a wine and cheese outlet, and a yachting service. He wrote a children's book, The King Needs Sleep.

Healey served as secretary of the Bristol County Bar Association from the mid-1980s to the mid-2010s.

Death
Healey was found dead in his bed at his home in Barrington, Rhode Island before midnight on March 20, 2016. He is believed to have died from a heart attack in his sleep. He was 58 years old. He was buried on March 29 next to his parents at St. Alexander's Cemetery in Warren, Rhode Island.

Upon Healey's death, Rhode Island governor—and his 2014 gubernatorial opponent—Gina Raimondo issued a statement to the Providence Journal that she would "miss his passion and willingness to engage in spirited debate."

Electoral history

References

External links
Bob Healey's Campaign Journal – A Guerrilla Guide to the Cerebral Revolution

1957 births
2016 deaths
Boston University School of Education alumni
Burials in Rhode Island
Businesspeople from Providence, Rhode Island
Columbia University alumni
New England Law Boston alumni
Northwestern University alumni
People from Barrington, Rhode Island
Rhode Island College alumni
Rhode Island Independents
Rhode Island lawyers
School board members in Rhode Island
Writers from Providence, Rhode Island
American political party founders
20th-century American businesspeople
20th-century American lawyers